The Shire of Greenough was a local government area in the Mid West region of Western Australia,  north of the state capital, Perth surrounding the city of Geraldton.

Historically a rural area, with the growth of Geraldton in recent years as a port and city, the areas of the Shire closest to Geraldton became increasingly urbanised. The council amalgamated with the City of Geraldton in 2007 to form the City of Geraldton-Greenough. On 1 July 2011 it became part of the City of Greater Geraldton.

History

The Shire of Greenough originated as the Geraldton-Greenough Road District, which was established on 21 December 1951 with the amalgamation of the Geraldton Road District and the Greenough Road District. It was declared a shire as the Shire of Geraldton-Greenough with effect from 1 July 1961 following the passage of the Local Government Act 1960, which reformed all remaining road districts into shires. It was renamed the Shire of Greenough on 19 March 1965.

It ceased to exist in 2007 when it merged with the City of Geraldton to form the City of Geraldton-Greenough.

Amalgamation
A recommendation was made to the Minister for Local Government by the Local Government Advisory Board in August 2006 to amalgamate the Shire of Greenough with the City of Geraldton.

The Greenough electors successfully petitioned for a referendum to determine whether amalgamation should proceed. This was held on 2 December 2006, and with a participation rate of 28.74%, a majority of 80% voted against the proposal. However, under the Local Government Act 1995 (clause 10 of Schedule 2.1) as the vote did not attract 50% of registered voters, it did not meet the requirements for a valid poll.

The councillors of both local government authorities resigned at the end of April 2007, and the first elections for new councillors took place in October 2007.

Wards
The Shire was divided into four wards until 2005 – West and Tarcoola Wards, each with four councillors, and North and South wards, each with two councillors. In May 2005, due to a redistribution of boundaries, the Central and Wandina Wards, each with four councillors, and the Chapman North Ward with three councillors were created.

Towns and localities

Localities/suburbs:

 Deepdale
 Glenfield
 Karloo
 Moresby
 Mount Tarcoola (split with City of Geraldton)
 Narngulu
 Rudds Gully
 Strathalbyn
 Tarcoola Beach
 Utakarra (split with City of Geraldton)
 Waggrakine
 Wandina
 Woorree

Towns:

 Cape Burney
 Drummond Cove
 Eradu
 Greenough
 Kojarena
 Minnenooka
 Moonyoonooka
 Walkaway
 Wicherina

Population

References

Greenough
2007 disestablishments in Australia